Kurpaty is an urban-type settlement in the Yalta Municipality of the Autonomous Republic of Crimea, a territory recognized by a majority of countries as part of Ukraine and annexed by Russia as the Republic of Crimea.

Nearby is the Dvuyakornaya Formation, containing several types of fossil. It is administratively subordinate to the Livadiya Settlement Council. Its population was 143 in the 2001 Ukrainian census. Current population:

References

External links
 

Urban-type settlements in Crimea
Seaside resorts in Russia
Seaside resorts in Ukraine
Yalta Municipality